Celtic de Paris were a French rugby league team from the city of Paris. The club played most games at La Cipale, Saint-Ouen, and occasionally at the Parc des Princes.

Maurice Tardy was the president of the club in the 1950s, signing star players including Puig Aubert. The club ceased to exist in the 1970s.

French rugby league teams
1950 establishments in France
Rugby clubs established in 1950
Defunct rugby league teams in France